Delta-sigma (ΔΣ; or sigma-delta, ΣΔ) modulation is a method for encoding analog signals into digital signals as found in an analog-to-digital converter (ADC). It is also used to convert high-bit-count, low-frequency digital signals into lower-bit-count, higher-frequency digital signals as part of the process to convert digital signals into analog as part of a digital-to-analog converter (DAC).

In a conventional ADC, an analog signal is sampled with a sampling frequency and subsequently quantized in a multi-level quantizer into a digital signal. This process introduces quantization error noise. The first step in a delta-sigma modulation is delta modulation. In delta modulation the change in the signal (its delta) is encoded, rather than the absolute value. The result is a stream of pulses, as opposed to a stream of numbers as is the case with pulse-code modulation (PCM). In delta-sigma modulation, accuracy of the modulation is improved by passing the digital output through a 1-bit DAC and adding (sigma) the resulting analog signal to the input signal (the signal before delta modulation), thereby reducing the error introduced by the delta modulation.

Both ADCs and DACs can employ delta-sigma modulation. A delta-sigma ADC first encodes an analog signal using high-frequency delta-sigma modulation and then applies a digital filter to form a higher-resolution but lower sample-frequency digital output. A delta-sigma DAC encodes a high-resolution digital input signal into a lower-resolution but higher sample-frequency signal that is mapped to voltages, and then smoothed with an analog filter. In both cases, the temporary use of a lower-resolution signal simplifies circuit design and improves efficiency.

Primarily because of its cost efficiency and reduced circuit complexity, this technique has found increasing use in modern electronic components such as DACs, ADCs, frequency synthesizers, switched-mode power supplies and motor controllers. The coarsely-quantized output of a delta-sigma modulator is occasionally used directly in signal processing or as a representation for signal storage. For example, the Super Audio CD (SACD) stores the output of a delta-sigma modulator directly on a disk.

Motivation 

Delta-sigma modulation converts an analog voltage signal into a pulse frequency, or pulse density, which can be understood as pulse-density modulation (PDM).  A sequence of positive and negative pulses, representing bits at a known fixed rate, is very easy to generate, transmit, and accurately regenerate at the receiver, given only that the timing and sign of the pulses can be recovered.  Given such a sequence of pulses from a delta-sigma modulator, the original waveform can be reconstructed with adequate precision.  In contrast, without conversion to a pulse stream but simply transmitting the analog signal directly, all noise in the system would be added to the analog signal, reducing its quality.  The use of PDM as a signal representation is an alternative to pulse-code modulation (PCM), sampling and quantizing to a multi-bit code at the Nyquist rate.

Analog to digital conversion

Description 
A delta-sigma or other pulse-density or pulse-frequency modulator generates a pulse stream in which the frequency, of pulses in the stream is proportional to the analog voltage input, so that , where  is a constant for the particular implementation. At each step a pulse is added to the pulse stream.

Because  may take any designed value, it may be made large enough to give any desired resolution or accuracy.

Analysis 

For the purpose of introduction, Figure 1 illustrates the concept of voltage-to-frequency conversion, in an unclocked form that resembles delta-sigma modulation, and is called asynchronous modulation, asynchronous delta-sigma modulation, or free-running modulators.  

Shown below that are waveforms at points designated by numbers 1 to 5 for an input of 0.2 volts in the left column and 0.4 volts in the right column.  The stream of delta impulses generated at each threshold crossing is shown at (2) and the difference between (1) and (2) is shown at (3). This difference is integrated to produce the waveform (4). The threshold detector generates a pulse (5) which starts as the waveform (4) crosses the threshold and is sustained until the waveform (4) falls below the threshold. The threshold (5) triggers the impulse generator to produce a fixed-strength impulse.

The integral (4) crosses the threshold in half the time in the right column than in the left column. Thus the frequency of impulses is doubled. Hence the count increments at twice the speed on the right to that on the left; this pulse rate doubling is consistent with the input voltage being doubled.

Construction of the waveforms illustrated at (4) is aided by concepts associated with the Dirac delta function in that, by definition, all impulses of the same strength produce the same step when integrated. Then (4) is constructed using an intermediate step (6), a hypothetical waveform not in the circuit but in which each integrated ideal delta function impulse is integrated to a step. The effect of the finite duration of the actual pulse is constructed in (4) by drawing a line from the base of the impulse step at zero volts to intersect the decay line from (6) at the full duration of the pulse.

In the circuit outside the loop, the summing interval is a predetermined fixed time, and at its expiry, the count is stored, and the buffer and the counter are reset. The buffer then presents a sequence of digital values corresponding to quantizations of the analog signal levels during the summing intervals.  Using a summing interval is a way (not necessarily the ideal way) to quantize the asynchronous pulse stream to a code; it will have less quantization error if the interval start is synchronized to a pulse.

Delta-sigma converters further constrain operation of the impulse generator such that the start of the impulse is delayed until the next occurrence of the appropriate clock-pulse boundary. The effect of this delay is illustrated in Figure 1a for a sequence of impulses that occur at a nominal 2.5 clock intervals.

Practical implementation 

A circuit diagram for a delta-sigma modulator implementation is shown in Figure 1b, with the associated waveforms in Figure 1c.  The waveforms shown in Figure 1c are unusually complicated because they are intended to illustrate the loop behavior under extreme conditions,  saturated at full scale of 1.0 V, and saturated at zero. An intermediate state is also indicated,  at 0.4V, where it is very similar to the operation of the illustration of Figure 1.

From the top of Figure 1c, the waveforms, labeled as they are on the circuit diagram, are:
 The clock
 (a)  – this is shown as varying from 0.4 V initially to 1.0 V  and then to zero volts to show the effect on the feedback loop.
 (b) The impulse waveform feeding the integrator. Controlled by flip-flop output (f) below.
To show this sum as a voltage the product  is plotted. The input impedance of the amplifier is regarded as so high that the current drawn by the input is neglected. The capacitor is connected between the negative input terminal of the amplifier and its output terminal. With this connection, it provides a negative feedback path around the amplifier. The input voltage change is equal to the output voltage change divided by the amplifier gain. With very high amplifier gain the change in input voltage can be neglected and so the input voltage is held close to the voltage on the positive input terminal which in this case is held at 0V.
This negation is standard for the op amp integrator and comes about because the current into the capacitor at the amplifier input is the current out of the capacitor at the amplifier output and the voltage is the integral of the current divided by the capacitance .
 (e) The comparator output. The comparator is a very high gain amplifier with its plus input terminal connected for reference to 0.0 V. Whenever the negative input terminal is taken negative with respect the positive terminal of the amplifier the output saturates positive and conversely negative saturation for positive input. Thus the output saturates positive whenever the integral (d) goes below the 0 V reference level and the output remains there until (d) goes positive with respect to the 0 V reference.
 (f) The impulse timer is a D-type positive-edge-triggered flip-flop. Input information applied at D is transferred to Q on the occurrence of the positive edge of the clock pulse. Thus when the comparator output (e) is positive, Q goes positive or remains positive at the next positive clock edge. Similarly, when (e) is negative, Q goes negative at the next positive clock edge. Q controls the electronic switch to generate the current impulse (b) into the integrator. Examination of the waveform (e) during the initial period illustrated, when Vin is 0.4 V, shows (e) crossing the threshold well before the positive edge of the clock pulse so that there is an appreciable delay before the impulse starts. After the start of the impulse, there is further delay while (d) climbs back past the threshold. During this time the comparator output (e) remains high but goes low before the next trigger edge at which point the impulse timer goes low to follow the comparator. Thus the clock, in part, determines the duration of the impulse. For the next impulse, the threshold is crossed immediately before the trigger edge and so the comparator is only briefly positive.   (a) then goes to full scale, shortly before the end of the next impulse. For the remainder of that impulse, the capacitor current (c) goes to zero and hence the integrator slope briefly goes to zero. Following this impulse, the full-scale positive current flows (c) and the integrator sinks at its maximum rate and so crosses the threshold well before the next trigger edge. At that edge the impulse starts and the  current is now matched by the reference current so that the net capacitor current (c) is zero. The integration now has zero slope and remains at the negative value it had at the start of the impulse. This has the effect that the impulse current remains switched on because Q is stuck positive because the comparator is stuck positive at every trigger edge. This is consistent with contiguous, butting impulses which is representative of full-scale input. Next  (a) goes to zero which causes the current sum (c) to go fully negative and the integral ramps up. It shortly thereafter crosses the threshold and this in turn is followed by Q, thus switching the impulse current off. The capacitor current (c) is now zero and so the integral slope is zero, remaining constant at the value it had acquired at the end of the impulse.
 (g) The countstream is generated by gating the negated clock with Q to produce this waveform. Thereafter the summing interval, sigma count, and buffered count are produced using appropriate counters and registers.

Improvements to resolution and noise

Examination of Figure 1c(g) shows that there are zero pulses in the countstream when the input voltage is zero. This condition can have the effect that high-frequency components of a complex signal are not resolved.  This effect is known as intermodulation distortion  (IMD). One of the pitfalls of applying linear analysis to a nonlinear system is that IMD, because it can be a consequence of nonlinearity, is not present in the analysis. Purely for illustrative purposes, a method to mitigate this would be to add an 0.5 volt constant bias to the input voltage so the it now can swing +/− 0.5 V about the bias.  This now has zero pulses in the countstream when the input is −0.5 V. Then we must limit the input swing to +/− 0.4 V, say, so that the minimum countstream frequency is greater than zero. We can choose the clock frequency so that the minimum countstream frequency at −0.4 V is much greater than the Nyquist rate, so that even  the highest input frequency component is resolved.  We can increase the clock frequency still higher until a lowpass filter sufficiently removes the pulsations while fully recovering the input signal.  In this illustrative discussion the filtered signal will also recover the bias which can be removed by an analog adder, while still retaining the DC component of the input signal.

Remarks 

According to Wooley, the seminal paper combining feedback with oversampling to achieve delta modulation was by F. de Jager in 1952.

The delta-sigma configuration was devised by Inose et al. in 1962 to solve problems in the accurate transmission of analog signals. In that application it was the pulse stream that was transmitted and the original analog signal recovered with a lowpass filter after the received pulses had been reformed. This low pass filter performed the summation function associated with Σ. The highly mathematical treatment of transmission errors was introduced by them and is appropriate when applied to the pulse stream but these errors are lost in the accumulation process associated with Σ.

For the analog-to-digital conversion application each pulse in the count stream is a sample of the mean of the input voltage equal to the reference voltage divided the interval between pulses, ts. This because it is an integration of the input waveform over interval ts. Frequency domain analysis of the complex waveform in this interval, ts, will represent it by the sum of a constant plus a fundamental and harmonics each of which has an exact integer number of cycles over ts. The integral of a sine wave over one or more full cycles is zero. Therefore, the integral of the incoming waveform over the interval ts reduces to the mean over the interval. The count, N, accumulated during the summing interval represents N samples of the mean and N divided by the count defining the summing interval is thus the mean of means and so subject to little variance.

Digital to analog conversion

In general, a DAC converts a digital number, N, representing some analog value into that analog voltage value. To make the conversion the digital number is first loaded into a counter. Then the counter is counted down to zero with a string of pulses equal in number to N. Each pulse of the string is given a known integral, δ. Then the string is integrated to produce N.δ, the sum of the pulses. This is the required analog voltage.

In some applications where an analog signal is represented by a series of digital numbers that require conversion to a frequency-modulated stream it may be sufficient to take the stream of pulses (two or three level)  resulting from the DAC conversion of each number N in turn and apply that stream through a low pass filter directly to the output. The output before filtering will be a crudely frequency-modulated stream with bursts of pulses proportional in length and number to the analog of N separated by blank intervals between bursts.

In order to remove the blank intervals and improve the noise performance the full conversion to analog voltage of each successive N by the DAC described above may be held in a sample and hold circuit then passed to a delta-sigma converter to produce a stream of contiguous bursts each of which has its frequency proportional to its generating  N.

Decimation structures 
The conceptually simplest decimation structure is a counter that is reset to zero at the beginning of each integration period, then read out at the end of the integration period.

The multi-stage noise shaping (MASH) structure has a noise shaping property, and is commonly used in digital audio and fractional-N frequency synthesizers.  It comprises two or more cascaded overflowing accumulators, each of which is equivalent to a first-order sigma-delta modulator.  The carry outputs are combined through summations and delays to produce a binary output, the width of which depends on the number of stages (order) of the MASH.  Besides its noise shaping function, it has two more attractive properties:
 simple to implement in hardware; only common digital blocks such as accumulators, adders, and D flip-flops are required
 unconditionally stable (there are no feedback loops outside the accumulators)

A very popular decimation structure is the sinc filter. For second-order modulators, the sinc3 filter is close to optimum.

Example of decimation 
Given an 8:1 decimation filter and a 1-bit bitstream:
 the sample frequency is reduced by a factor of eight
 the serial (1-bit) input bus becomes a parallel (3-bits) output bus.
For example, the input stream 10010110 contains 4 1s. The decimation result is 4/8 = 0.5. This result can be represented by the 3-bit binary number 100, which corresponds to half of the largest possible number. 
Once decimation is applied, if the n-bit codes are transmitted, the signal becomes PCM. Decimation is strongly associated with delta-sigma modulation but is distinct.

Variations 

There are many kinds of ADC that use this delta-sigma structure.
The above analysis focuses on the simplest 1st-order, 2-level, uniform-decimation sigma-delta ADC.
Many ADCs use a second-order 5-level sinc3 sigma-delta structure. Much of what follows uses an arcane shorthand using symbols representing operational functions with analysis given in terms of Laplace transforms, etc. This is the lingua franca of the data transmission industry and it does not communicate to the general public. If a fuller documentation of a particular method is needed look no further than the patents. (Patent examiners generally require full disclosure.) An excellent history is "The Evolution of Oversampling Analog-to-Digital Converters" by Bruce A. Wooley which gives many references to the relevant patents.

Second-order and higher-order modulator 

The number of integrators, and consequently, the numbers of feedback loops, indicates the order of a ΔΣ modulator; a second-order ΔΣ modulator is shown in Figure 2. First-order modulators are unconditionally stable, but stability analysis must be performed for higher-order modulators.

3-level and higher quantizer 
The modulator can also be classified by the number of bits it has in its output, which strictly depends on the output of the quantizer. The quantizer can be realized with a N-level comparator, thus the modulator has log2N-bit output.
A simple comparator has 2 levels and so is 1 bit quantizer; a 3-level quantizer is called a "1.5" bit quantizer; a 4-level quantizer is a 2-bit quantizer; a 5-level quantizer is called a 2.5-bit quantizer.

Relationship to delta modulation 

Delta-sigma modulation is inspired by delta modulation, as shown in Figure 3. If quantization were homogeneous (e.g., if it were linear), the following would be a sufficient derivation of the equivalence:
 Start with a block diagram of a delta modulator/demodulator.
 The linearity property of integration, makes it possible to move the integrator, which reconstructs the analog signal in the demodulator section, in front of the delta modulator.
 Again, the linearity property of the integration allows the two integrators to be combined and a delta-sigma modulator/demodulator block diagram is obtained.
Because the quantizer is not homogeneous, delta-sigma is inspired by delta modulation, but the two are distinct in operation. 

From the first block diagram in Figure 3, the integrator in the feedback path can be removed if the feedback is taken directly from the input of the low-pass filter. Hence, for delta modulation of input signal , the low-pass filter sees the signal

However, sigma-delta modulation of the same input signal places at the low-pass filter

In other words, delta-sigma and delta modulation swap the position of the integrator and quantizer. The net effect is a simpler implementation that has the added benefit of shaping the quantization noise to be mostly in frequencies above the signals of interest. This effect becomes more dramatic with increased oversampling, which allows for quantization noise to be somewhat programmable. On the other hand, delta modulation shapes both noise and signal equally.

Additionally, the quantizer (e.g., comparator) used in delta modulation has a small output representing a small step up and down the quantized approximation of the input while the quantizer used in delta-sigma must take values outside of the range of the input signal, as shown in Figure 4.

In general, delta-sigma has some advantages versus delta modulation:
 The structure is simplified as
 only one integrator is needed,
 the demodulator can be a simple linear filter (e.g., RC or LC filter) to reconstruct the signal and
 the quantizer (e.g., comparator) can have full-scale outputs
 The quantized value is the integral of the difference signal,  which makes it less sensitive to the rate of change of the signal.

Quantization theory formulas 
When a signal is quantized, the resulting signal has approximately the second-order statistics of a signal with independent white noise added.  Assuming that the signal value is in the range of one step of the quantized value with an equal distribution, the root mean square value of this quantization noise is

In reality, the quantization noise is, of course, not independent of the signal and this dependence results in limit cycles and is the source of idle tones and pattern noise in sigma-delta converters.

Quantization noise may be reduced by increasing the oversampling ratio (OSR) defined by

The RMS noise voltage within the band of interest can be expressed in terms of OSR

Oversampling 

ΔΣ modulation is a technique of oversampling to reduce the noise in the band of interest (green in Figure 5), which avoids the use of high-precision analog circuits for the anti-aliasing filter. The total quantization noise is the same both in a Nyquist converter (in yellow) and in an oversampling converter (in blue), but it is distributed over a different spectrum. In ΔΣ converters, noise is further reduced at low frequencies, which is the band where the signal of interest is, and it is increased at the higher frequencies, where it can be filtered out. This technique is known as noise shaping.

For a first-order delta-sigma modulator, the noise is shaped by a filter with transfer function .  Assuming that the sampling frequency  is large compared to a signal frequency of interest, the quantization noise in the desired signal bandwidth can be approximated as:
 .

Similarly for a second-order delta-sigma modulator, the noise is shaped by a filter with transfer function . The in-band quantization noise can be approximated as:
 .

In general, for a -order ΔΣ modulator, the variance of the in-band quantization noise is:
 .

When the sampling frequency is doubled, the signal-to-quantization-noise ratio is improved by  dB for a -order ΔΣ modulator. The higher the oversampling ratio, the higher the signal-to-noise ratio and the higher the resolution in bits.

Another key aspect given by oversampling is the speed/resolution tradeoff.  The decimation filter put after the modulator not only filters the whole sampled signal in the band of interest (cutting the noise at higher frequencies), but also reduces the frequency of the signal, increasing its resolution. This is obtained by a sort of averaging of the higher-data-rate bitstream.

Naming 
The technique was first presented in the early 1960s by professor Yasuhiko Yasuda while he was a student at the University of Tokyo. The name delta-sigma comes directly from the presence of a delta modulator and an integrator, as firstly introduced by Inose et al. in their patent application. That is, the name comes from integrating or summing differences, which, in mathematics, are operations usually associated with Greek letters sigma and delta respectively. Both names sigma-delta and delta-sigma are frequently used.

See also 
 Pulse-width modulation
 Continuously variable slope delta modulation

References

Further reading

External links 
 1-bit A/D and D/A Converters
 Sigma-delta techniques extend DAC resolution article by Tim Wescott 2004-06-23
 Tutorial on Designing Delta-Sigma Modulators: Part I and Part II by Mingliang (Michael) Liu
 Gabor Temes' Publications
 Sigma-Delta Modulation Primer Part II Contains Block diagrams, code, and simple explanations
 Example Simulink model & scripts for continuous-time sigma-delta ADC Contains example matlab code and Simulink model
 Bruce Wooley's Delta-Sigma Converter Projects
 An Introduction to Delta Sigma Converters (which covers both ADCs and DACs sigma-delta)
 Demystifying Sigma-Delta ADCs. This in-depth article covers the theory behind a Delta-Sigma analog-to-digital converter.
 One-Bit Delta Sigma D/A Conversion Part I: Theory article by Randy Yates presented at the 2004 comp.dsp conference
 MASH (Multi-stAge noise SHaping) structure with both theory and a block-level implementation of a MASH
 Continuous time sigma-delta ADC noise shaping filter circuit architectures discusses architectural trade-offs for continuous-time sigma-delta noise-shaping filters
 Delta Sigma Converters: Modulation – intuitive motivation for why a delta-sigma modulator works
 Digital accelerometer with feedback control using sigma-delta modulation

Digital signal processing

fr:Convertisseur analogique-numérique#Convertisseur Sigma Delta